Juliana Whonge Cherera was the Vice Chair at Kenya's Electoral agency IEBC until her resignation on 5th Dec 2022. She became a public subject in Kenya in mid-August 2022 after leading three other commissioners Francis Wanderi, Irene Masit, and Justus Nyang’aya in disowning the 2022 Kenyan general election results read out by Chair Wafula Chebukati terming them to be of an 'opaque nature'.

Career
She previously served as the Chief Executive in the Strategic Delivery Unit of the Mombasa County Government where she had served as Secretary in different portfolios. Prior to taking up the county jobs, Juliana worked as an Early Childhood Development Education (ECDE) teacher. 

She was appointed a commissioner at the IEBC on 2 September 2021 by former President of Kenya Uhuru Kenyatta. She was sworn in 12 days later by Chief Justice Martha Koome at the Supreme Court in Nairobi.

Weeks later she was unanimously elected as the Vice Chair. She resigned from the position on 5 December 2022 days after she, and three others, had been suspended by Kenya's President William Ruto.

Education
She attained a Bachelor of Arts (Education) from Kenyatta University with a specialization in Geography and Kiswahili and is a holder of a Master of Education in Leadership and Educational Management from KEMU. She also studied Project Management at the Kenya Institute of Management, Early Childhood Development Education (ECDE) at KNEC, and Strategic Leadership and Development Program at the Kenya School of Government. She is a member of the Kenya Devolution Support Program Committee.

References

Living people
1968 births
Kenyan chief executives
Kenyatta University alumni
Kenya Methodist University alumni